The Lomela River is a river in the Democratic Republic of the Congo. It is one of the main tributaries of the Busira River, which forms where the Lomela meets the Tshuapa River.
The Busira is in turn the main tributary of the Ruki River, which enters the Congo River to the north of Mbandaka.

Location

The Lomela River flows in a northwest direction from the Sankuru Nature Reserve and across the Salonga National Park.
The Busira River forms a few miles west of Boende where the Lomela River joins the Tshuapa River from the left.

Navigation

It is winding and narrow, and flows through forested and marshy areas that flood in the high water seasons.
In high water periods it can take 350 ton barges, and in low water periods can take 150-250 ton barges in this section. 
From Lomami up to Lomela the river is open to navigation only from early June to early September, and only for 25 ton barges.

Environment

The Lomela flows through the heart of the central depression of the Congo Basin.
Rainfall here averages  annually, with no dry season.
The Lomela meanders through a  area of permanent swamp forest from 20°35'E to 21°30'E, and through a  area of swamp forest between 21°50'E and 22°18'E.
Part of the river is protected by the Salonga National Park.

Notes

Sources

Rivers of the Democratic Republic of the Congo